Brett James Gladman (born April 19, 1966) is a Canadian astronomer and a full professor at the University of British Columbia's Department of Physics and Astronomy in Vancouver, British Columbia. He holds the Canada Research Chair in planetary astronomy.  He does both theoretical work (large-scale numerical simulations of planetary dynamics) and observational optical astronomy (being a discoverer of many planetary moons and minor planets).

Career 

Gladman is best known for his work in dynamical astronomy in the Solar System. He has studied the transport of meteorites between planets, the delivery of meteoroids from the main asteroid belt, and the possibility of the transport of life via this mechanism, known as panspermia. He also studies planet formation, especially the puzzle of how the giant planets came to be.

He is discoverer or co-discoverer of many astronomical bodies in the Solar System, asteroids, Kuiper Belt comets, and many moons of the giant planets:
 Uranus: Caliban, Sycorax, Prospero, Setebos, Stephano, and Ferdinand
 Saturn: A dozen satellites in several groups, each named after a theme of Canadian Inuit gods, French deities, and Norse gods
 Neptune: The satellite Neso
 Jupiter: Discovery and co-discovery of 6 moons

Honors and awards 

Gladman was awarded the H. C. Urey Prize by the Division of Planetary Sciences of the American Astronomical Society in 2002. The main-belt asteroid 7638 Gladman is named in his honor.  During 2008–2011 he served as member and chair of the Science Advisory Council of the Canada-France-Hawaii Telescope on Mauna Kea in Hawaii.  He was awarded a Killam Research Fellowship in 2015.

List of discovered minor planets 

Partial listing only below; discoveries number in the many hundreds of asteroids and Kuiper Belt objects.

See also

References

External links 
 Brett Gladman at the Astronomy group of the Dept. of Physics and Astronomy, UBC and Institute of Planetary Science

1966 births
21st-century Canadian astronomers
Canada Research Chairs
Discoverers of minor planets
Discoverers of moons
Discoverers of trans-Neptunian objects

Living people
Place of birth missing (living people)
Planetary scientists
Academic staff of the University of British Columbia